Lochan Sròn Smeur is an upland loch in Tayside, Scotland.

References

Sron Smeur
Tay catchment
Sron Smeur